The Ministry of Justice Investigation Bureau (MJIB) is a criminal-investigation and counter-intelligence agency reporting under the Ministry of Justice of the Republic of China (Taiwan). The agency is run by the Director-General which is accountable to the cabinet level minister, Minister of Justice. MJIB is a National Member of Egmont Group of Financial Intelligence Units and Asia/Pacific Group on Money Laundering.

History 
The Bureau of Investigation was established in 1928. Initially, it was called Central Bureau of Investigation and Statistics subordinated to the Central Executive Committee of the Chinese Nationalist Party (KMT). During that time, it was nicknamed "Zhong-Tong" (:zh:中統), meaning Central-Statistics. In 1930s and 1940s, it carried the responsibilities of intelligence-gathering and counter-intelligence. By 1949 the bureau was formally established into a government agency and assigned to the Ministry of the Interior. In 1956, the agency was transferred to the Ministry of Judicial Administration(:zh:司法行政部) and took over most of the counter-intelligence duty in Taiwan. In 1980 the agency was re-designated to the current Ministry of Justice.

During the martial law period under the KMT dictatorship the Investigation Bureau managed tens of thousands of informants across Taiwan. In 2021 a report commissioned by Taiwan’s Transitional Justice Commission into the Investigation Bureau’s use of informants during the martial law period was published.

Due to its historic background, initially all its field offices were to remain anonymous but later this tradition had been reviewed and decided that all units of MJIB are now transparent and accountable. Although it is a law enforcement agency, MJIB still exercises intelligence-gathering responsibilities but the focus is mainly on Taiwan.

In September 2020 the American Federal Bureau of Investigation thanked the Ministry of Justice Investigation Bureau for providing key information that led to the indictment of five Chinese hackers linked to APT-41, also known as the Winnti Group. While investigating breaches at three Taiwan based companies the Investigation Bureau discovered an APT-41 node operating on US soil and contacted their American counterparts to coordinate action against the Chinese hackers.

In December 11 2020, the bureau caught three Taiwanese who worked for Chinese intelligence. They were spreading propaganda about how Taiwan and the US were trying to overthrow the Thailand monarchy supporting the democracy protesters. The case is important because firstly it is the first Internet-related national security case the bureau investigated. And secondly it is the first time it has been documented that China has successfully recruited Taiwanese to work as paid online agents of its cyberarmy.

Mission 
Since 30 October 1998, the MJIB function has been redefined by an Executive Yuan decree.
The bureau has nine missions:
 Counter any internal disorder.
 Counter any disorder caused by foreigners.
 Counter any leak of national classified material.
 Anti-Corruption of any civil service.
 Drug control.
 Prevent any organized criminal organization.
 Counter any major economic crime.
 State's Internal Security Investigation.
 Any delegated missions or assignments regarding national security and national interests.

Chain of command
Administratively, MJIB is answerable to the Minister of Justice. As a result, all public procurators at all level are able to direct the human resource of MJIB. Operationally, MJIB is subjected to the coordination and supervision of National Security Bureau. Naturally, the director of MJIB could be summoned by the Taiwan President for consultant because of MJIB's eighth and ninth missions of responsibility in Taiwan.

References

External links 

 Bureau of Investigation (TAIWAN) 
 Investigation Bureau in the website of GlobalSecurity.org 
 The Investigator Association for the reform of National Bureau of investigation 

1928 establishments in China
Law enforcement agencies of Taiwan
Taiwanese intelligence agencies
Domestic intelligence agencies